The Battle of Perire was fought in 1208 BCE between the New Kingdom of Egypt, led by the pharaoh Merneptah, and a coalition of Libyan tribes, along with a large contingent of Sea Peoples. The Egyptians gained a decisive victory. This was the first of many encounters between Egypt and the Sea Peoples. Our main source of information about this battle comes from the Great Karnak Inscription.

Prelude 
In the late 13th century BCE a famine in Libya compelled many of the tribes in the region to unite under the leadership of a chief known as Meryey. Together these tribes prepared to invade Egypt. Their exact intentions are unclear but they most likely wished to set up a new Libyan dynasty of Egypt, or else set up a new state within the borders of Egypt. The Libyans were rich through control of trade from Central Africa to the Mediterranean Sea and so were able to hire the Sea Peoples, who were currently raiders and mercenaries. The Libyans first captured an oasis to the west of Egypt, now thought to be Siwa Oasis. There is also an apparent Nubian raid in southern Egypt around the same time, hinting at an alliance between the Libyans and Nubians, though nothing ever becomes of it. After capturing the oasis the Libyan army moved into Egypt proper where they were met by the pharaoh Mernephtah at Perire, most likely a city in the Nile Delta region.

Battle 
Not much is known about the exact details of the Battle at Perire except that the Egyptian archers spent 6 hours attacking the enemy before the Egyptian chariots then charged in and presumably caused a rout. This gives no details about what the infantry was doing at the time. The Sea Peoples made superior infantry than the Egyptians and so it is presumed that Merneptah never fully engaged his infantry, only using them to occupy the enemy while his archers done the real work. Then, after Merneptah thought the enemy lines had been suitably thinned, he sent in his chariots to finish the work. However the battle actually occurred, the Egyptians gained a decisive victory over the Libyans, killing 6,000 and capturing 9,000

Aftermath 
Meryey was killed during the battle and without leadership the Libyan coalition returned home and promptly collapsed. Whatever Sea Peoples survived the battle would’ve left to find work elsewhere. The Sea Peoples would grow into a bigger problem in the coming years, and a major cause of the Bronze Age collapse. They would clash with Egypt again, attempting to invade the country in either 1178 or 1175 BCE, until stopped at the twin battles of Djahy and the Delta.

References

Perire
Ancient Egyptians
Ancient Libya
Mercenaries
13th century BC
Perire